Saint Michael's Church (Dutch: Sint-Michielskerk) is a Roman Catholic church in Ghent, Belgium built in a late Gothic style.  It is known for its rich interior decoration.

History
Documents from 1105 testify to the existence on the site of a chapel dedicated to St. Michael which was subordinate to another parish.  The building was twice destroyed by fire early in the twelfth century and rebuilt. From 1147 it was recognized as an independent parochial church.

Construction of the current late Gothic church was probably commenced in 1440, and took place in two phases, separated by a long interval. During the first phase, in the fifteenth and sixteenth centuries, the western part of the building  was built, including the tower, the three-aisled nave and transept.  This was completed in 1528. The construction of the western tower continued and by 1566 two levels of the tower were completed. Then, due to religious conflicts, not only did construction stop, but looting and destruction took place.  Part of the church was destroyed in 1578 by Calvinists and in 1579 the old choir was demolished.

Reconstruction of the church only started in 1623.  The early Gothic choir was replaced by a choir in Brabantine Gothic.  Local architect Lieven Cruyl made a design for the unfinished western tower in 1662. The design provided for a spire of 134-metre-high in Brabantine Gothic style but was never realised.  As a result of these delays and cost concerns, the tower was in the end never completed.  Only in 1828 was a flat roof built over the unfinished tower.

The sacristy in the north-east was constructed in Baroque style in 1650-1651.

Description
The exterior of the sober late Gothic church is entirely constructed with sandstone from Brussels and Ledian sandstone. The church has a rich Neo-Gothic interior, including an altar and a pulpit in that style.  There are various 18th century statues, including a Saint Livinus by Laurent Delvaux, a wooden St. Sebastian by J. Franciscus Allaert, eight marble statues of saints and a copy of Michelangelo's Madonna of Bruges by Rombaut Pauwels.

The church contains many Baroque paintings, including Christ Dying on the Cross by Anthony van Dyck, the Resurrection of Lazarus by Otto Venius and paintings by Gaspar de Crayer, Philippe de Champaigne, Karel van Mander, Jan Boeckhorst, Antoon van den Heuvel, Theodoor van Thulden and others.

There are confessionals from various style periods including a Baroque confessional from the early 17th century by François Cruyt with statues sculpted by Michiel van der Voort the Elder.

Organ
The organ dates back to an instrument that was built in 1817 by the organ builder De Volder. The style of the front is fully made in gothic revival. In 1951 the instrument was remodeled and expanded by the organ builder Anneessens. The organ has 47 stops on three manuals and a pedal.

Church Treasure
There are numerous silver and gold artifacts in the silver collection. An important item is the relic of St Dorothea, in silver. Very famous is the relic of the sacred "Doorn" brought to the church by Mary, Queen of Scots, and a relic of the true Cross a gift of the Archduke Albrecht and Isabella in 1619.

References

External links

Roman Catholic churches in Ghent
Roman Catholic churches in Belgium
Churches in East Flanders